Carlos Héctor Zorrilla (born 1978) was an Argentine footballer.

He played for clubs like 2 de Mayo and U. de Concepción.

References
 Profile at BDFA 

Living people
Argentine footballers
Argentine expatriate footballers
Argentina international footballers
Universidad de Concepción footballers
Puerto Montt footballers
Chilean Primera División players
Primera B de Chile players
Expatriate footballers in Paraguay
Expatriate footballers in Chile
Argentine expatriate sportspeople in Chile
Argentine expatriate sportspeople in Paraguay
Association football defenders
1985 births
Sportspeople from Lanús